HC All Stars Piemonte was an ice hockey team in Turin, Italy.

History
The club was created in 2000 by Claudio Gabriele Belforte with the intention of developing young players in the Turin area. In 2006, the team played in the Serie A2, the second level of Italian ice hockey. The club has not participated, and apparently has been defunct, since 2008 (see  External links).

External links
  (All snapshots of this website on archive.org after this date are 404.)

Turin
Ice hockey clubs established in 2000
2000 establishments in Italy
Sport in Turin
2008 disestablishments in Italy
Ice hockey clubs disestablished in 2008